"Need You Tonight" is a song by the Australian rock band INXS, released as the first single from their 1987 album, Kick, as well as the fourth song on the album. It is the only INXS single to reach No. 1 on the Billboard Hot 100. It also achieved their highest charting position in the United Kingdom, where the song reached number two on the UK Singles Chart; however, this peak was only reached after a re-release of the single in November 1988. On its first run on the UK charts in October 1987, it stalled at No. 58. It was one of the last songs recorded for the album, yet it would arguably become the band's signature song.

In February 2014, after the Channel 7 screening of the INXS: Never Tear Us Apart mini-series, "Need You Tonight" charted again in Australia via download sales. It peaked at No. 28 on the ARIA Singles Chart.  In January 2018, as part of Triple M's "Ozzest 100", the 'most Australian' songs of all time, "Need You Tonight" was ranked number 69.

Background
In INXS's official autobiography, INXS: Story to Story, Andrew Farriss said that the famous riff to the song appeared suddenly in his head while waiting for a cab to go to the airport to fly to Hong Kong. He asked the cab driver to wait a couple of minutes while he grabbed something from his motel room. In reality, he went up to record the riff and came back down an hour later with a tape to a very annoyed driver.

The song is a much more electronic track than most of the band's material before or after, combining sequencers with regular drum tracks and a number of tracks of layered guitars. To approximate the sound on the recorded track, the band often utilizes click tracks for a frequent synthesizer chord as well as rim shots heard throughout the song.

On the Kick album, the song is linked to the next song, which is entitled either "Mediate" or "Meditate", depending on the pressing of the album. On some compilations, the two tunes appear together and on others, only "Need You Tonight" appears (rarely, if ever, has "Mediate" appeared on its own).

Music video
The music video combined live action and different kinds of animation. Directed by Richard Lowenstein, the video was actually "Need You Tonight / Mediate", as it combined two songs from the album. Lowenstein claimed that the particular visual effects in "Need You Tonight" were created by cutting up 35mm film and photocopying the individual frames, before re-layering those images over the original footage.

For "Mediate", it segues into a tribute to Bob Dylan's "Subterranean Homesick Blues". The members flip cue cards with words from the song; the last one displays the words "Sax Solo," at which point Kirk Pengilly starts a saxophone solo. Beneath the lyric "a special date" in the "Mediate" portion of the video, the cue card shown reads "9-8-1945" which in Australian date format is 9 August 1945, the date which the atomic bomb was dropped on Nagasaki, Japan.

The video won five MTV Video Music Awards including 1988 Video of The Year and was ranked at number twenty-one on MTV's countdown of the 100 greatest videos of all time.

Track listings
7" single
"Need You Tonight" – 3:01
"I'm Coming (Home)" – 4:54

7" single
"Need You Tonight" – 3:01
"Need You Tonight" (Mendelsohn Extended Mix) – 7:02

12" single
"Need You Tonight" – 3:01
"Mediate" – 2:35
"I'm Coming (Home)" – 4:53

12" single
"Need You Tonight" (Mendelsohn Extended Mix) – 7:02
"Move On" – 4:47
"Kiss the Dirt (Falling Down the Mountain)" – 3:54

12" single 
"Need You Tonight" (Ben Liebrand Mix) – 7:18
"Move On" – 4:47
"New Sensation" (Extended Mix) – 6:30

CD Maxi single
"Need You Tonight" – 3:05
"Don't Dream It's Over" – 4:00
"Need You Tonight" (Extended version) – 6:36
"Need You Tonight" (Remix) – 4:03

Charts

Weekly charts

1 Static Revenger/Koishii & Hush Mixes
2 Remixes

Year-end charts

Certifications

Rogue Traders remix

Rogue Traders covered and remixed "Need You Tonight" and released it as a single in Australia. The song was renamed "One of My Kind", where it reached No. 10 on the Australian Top 100 Singles Chart, becoming their first top-10 hit. "One of My Kind" is the second single released by the Rogue Traders for their debut album We Know What You're Up To.

The music video is set in a dance party where the lizard on the single cover wanders around looking for a girl of his kind. He finds one looking lonely. The two sit together and he sings the line 'you're one of my kind' before the video ends.

The Sam Bennetts and Rising Sun Pictures directed music video was nominated for Best Video at the ARIA Music Awards of 2003.

Track listings
Maxi CD single
"One of My Kind" (radio edit)
"One of My Kind" (club mix edit)
"One of My Kind" (Phunked remix)

12" vinyl
"One of My Kind" (12" mix)
"One of My Kind" (radio edit)
"One of My Kind" (dub mix)

Australian CD single
"One of My Kind" (radio edit)
"One of My Kind" (Rogue Traders club adventure)
"One of My Kind" (Swimming in blue mix)
"One of My Kind" (Rogue Traders dub)
"Make It Better" (original mix)

Charts
The single spent 15 weeks on the ARIA Charts, nine of which were in the top 50. The single also topped the ARIA Club and Dance charts.

Weekly charts

Year-end charts

Other cover versions
Australian singer Kylie Minogue performed the song as part of the setlist of her Kiss Me Once Tour. Minogue, a one-time romantic partner of the late INXS frontman Michael Hutchence, considered her performances of the song to be a tribute to him.
In March 2010, UK rapper Professor Green released a song based entirely on the song called "I Need You Tonight".
Bonnie Raitt covers the song as the second track of her 2016 album “Dig in Deep.” 
English singer and songwriter Dua Lipa's 2020 single "Break My Heart" interpolates the song's guitar riff.

See also
List of Billboard Hot 100 number-one singles of 1988
List of Cash Box Top 100 number-one singles of 1988

References

1987 songs
1987 singles
1988 singles
2003 singles
2005 singles
APRA Award winners
ARIA Award-winning songs
Atlantic Records singles
Billboard Hot 100 number-one singles
Cashbox number-one singles
INXS songs
Mercury Records singles
MTV Video of the Year Award
Rogue Traders songs
Song recordings produced by Chris Thomas (record producer)
Songs written by Andrew Farriss
Songs written by Michael Hutchence
Warner Music Group singles